Century Publishing can refer to:

 Century Publishing, a custom media publisher based in Salt Lake City, Utah, U.S., founded in 1981 by Larry L. Richman, name  changed to Century Publishing in 1995
 Century, an imprint of Cornerstone, formerly part of Random House, now Penguin Random House
 The Century Company, an American publishing company, 1881–1933

See also
Century (disambiguation)